Alfred Erich Senn (April 12, 1932 – March 8, 2016) was a professor of history at the University of Wisconsin–Madison.

Senn was born  in Madison, Wisconsin, to Swiss philologist and lexicographer, . His father taught at the University of Lithuania, where he met his future wife. After they married, they moved to the United States in 1930 or 1931, along with two daughters.

Senn received a BA in 1953 from the University of Pennsylvania and then an MA in 1955 and a PhD in 1958 from Columbia University in East European history. He started teaching at the University of Wisconsin–Madison in 1961, and he retired as professor emeritus.

Senn was the author of various books and numerous scholarly articles. Many of his works center on the history of Lithuania. His book Gorbachev's Failure in Lithuania was awarded the Edgar Anderson Presidential Prize by the American Association of Baltic Studies in 1996. He died at his home in Madison on March 8, 2016.

Works
 Lithuania 1940: Revolution from Above. Amsterdam: Ropodi, 2007. 
 Power, Politics, and the Olympic Games. Champaign, IL: Human Kinetics, 1999. 
 Gorbachev's Failure in Lithuania. New York: St. Martin's Press, 1995. 
 Lithuania Awakening. Berkeley: University of California Press, 1990. 
 Assassination in Switzerland: The Murder of Vatslav Vorovsky. Madison: University of Wisconsin Press, 1981. 
 Jonas Basanavičius, the Patriarch of the Lithuanian National Renaissance. Newtonville, MA: Oriental Research Partners, 1980. 
 Nicholas Rubakin: A Life for Books. Newtonville, MA: Oriental Research Partners, 1977. 
 Diplomacy and Revolution: the Soviet Mission to Switzerland, 1918. Notre Dame, IN: University of Notre Dame Press, 1974. 
 The Russian Revolution in Switzerland, 1914–1917. Madison: University of Wisconsin Press, 1971. 
 The Great Powers, Lithuania and the Vilna Question 1920–1928. Leiden: E.J. Brill, 1966. 
 The Emergence of Modern Lithuania. New York: Columbia University Press, 1959.

References

Balticists
1932 births
2016 deaths
Writers from Madison, Wisconsin
20th-century American historians
American male non-fiction writers
Historians of Lithuania
University of Wisconsin–Madison faculty
American people of Swiss descent
American people of Lithuanian descent
Historians from Wisconsin
20th-century American male writers